Stary Chetyrman (İśke Sıtırman) is a rural locality (a selo) in Bala-Chetyrmansky Selsoviet, Fyodorovsky District, Bashkortostan, Russia. The population was 291 as of 2010. There are 4 streets.

Geography 
Stary Chetyrman is located 24 km southeast of Fyodorovka (the district's administrative centre) by road. Bala-Chetyrman is the nearest rural locality.

References 

Rural localities in Fyodorovsky District